The Boikanyo Solar Power Station is a  solar power plant in South Africa. It is a grid-connected, privately owned and privately funded solar power station. The power station, which took about one year to construct, reached "grid code compliance" on 9 April 2021 and provided 450 construction jobs.

Location
The power station is located near the town of Douglas, in Siyancuma Local Municipality, in the Pixley ka Seme District Municipality, in the Northern Cape Province of South Africa.

Overview
It comprises 184,000 solar panels, capable of collectively generating 152 GWh annually, enough to supply 62,000 South African homes. The power is evacuated via a 132kV high voltage transmission line to the Siyancuma substation, where the energy is integrated into the national grid. Eskom, the national electricity utility company of South Africa buys the generated electricity, under a twenty-year power purchase agreement.

Developers
The power station was developed by a consortium, which owns the station and has formed a special purpose vehicle company by the name: Boikanyo Power Company. The consortium comprises the corporate entities listed in the table below.

Other considerations
This power station was licensed under the Renewable Energy Independent Power Purchasing Programme (REIPPP). This program was designed by the Government of South Africa, with the objective of attracting "private investment in the renewable energy sector".

The same consortium of all South African-based IPPs was granted concessions to develop renewables as illustrated in the table below.

See also

List of power stations in South Africa
Greefspan II Solar Power Station
Zeerust Solar Power Station

References

External links
 Approximate Location of Boikanyo Solar Power Station

Solar power stations in South Africa
Pixley ka Seme District Municipality
Economy of the Northern Cape
2021 establishments in South Africa
Energy infrastructure completed in 2021
21st-century architecture in South Africa